Montreal is the second largest city in Canada and the largest city in the province of Quebec, located along the Saint Lawrence River at its junction with the Ottawa River. The city is geographically constrained, with the majority on the Island of Montreal in the Hochelaga Archipelago, and has several prominent features, including the eponymous Mount Royal. The region experiences four distinct seasons and is classified as a humid continental climate, with very cold and snowy winters and warm and humid summers.

Geographic location 

The city is located on the central and eastern portions of the Island of Montreal, the largest island in the Hochelaga Archipelago, at the confluence of the Saint Lawrence and Ottawa Rivers. The port of Montreal lies at one end of the Saint Lawrence Seaway, which is the river gateway that stretches from the Great Lakes into the Atlantic Ocean. Montreal is defined by its location in between the St. Lawrence river on its south, and by the Rivière des Prairies on its north. The city is named after the most prominent geographical feature on the island, a three-head hill called Mount Royal.

Montreal is at the centre of the Montreal Metropolitan Community, and is bordered by the city of Laval to the north, Longueuil to the south, Repentigny to the east and the West Island municipalities to the west. The anglophone enclaves of Westmount, Montreal West, Hampstead, Côte Saint-Luc, the Town of Mount Royal and the francophone enclave Montreal East are all entirely surrounded by the city of Montreal.

Geology 
There are three main geological regions in Quebec: the great igneous plains of the Canadian Shield, the Appalachians in southern Quebec, and the St. Lawrence lowlands that lie between them. Covering over 95% of Quebec, the Canadian Shield contains some of the oldest igneous rocks in the world, dating back to the Precambrian period, over 1 billion years ago. The Canadian Shield is generally quite flat and exposed, punctuated by the higher relief of mountain ranges such as the Laurentians in southern Quebec. The Appalachian region of Quebec is a thin strip of weathered mountains along Quebec's southeast border. The Appalachian mountain chain is actually a long range that runs from Alabama north to Newfoundland. The St. Lawrence lowlands are comparatively tiny in size (about ) but disproportionately important in that they contain most of the human population of Quebec. The lowlands actually consist of three parts: the central lowlands, or the St. Lawrence Plain, a wide and flat triangle extending from Cornwall to Quebec City. The St. Lawrence Plain is almost entirely flat because of the clay deposits left behind by the Champlain Sea (which once covered all of Montreal).

Street directions 

One quirk of common Montreal parlance is that directions (north, south, east, and west) along the street grid are sharply skewed relative to the actual compass directions. The St. Lawrence River is taken as flowing west to east (even though it flows north or northeast past the island), so that directions along streets parallel to the river are referred to as "west" and "east," and those along streets perpendicular to the river, "north" and "south." In much of Montreal, "north" is actually northwest, and in some areas such as Verdun and Pointe-aux-Trembles it is actually due west. The skew is greatest in Ville-Émard, where grid "north" on streets such as Rue Jolicœur is geographically west-southwest.

"Montreal directions" are used in naming street addresses and describing bus routes, among other things. As a result of this discrepancy, Montreal has been called "the only city where the sun sets in the north."

Further folk naming customs include giving directions involving going "up" or "down" streets that are perpendicular to the river; "up" being towards Mount Royal and "down" being towards the St. Lawrence. But the system can be confused on the north side of the mountain (whether "up" means uphill, i.e. Montreal "south," or towards Montreal "north" as it does downtown).

Streets are named "Ouest" or "Est" when they cross Saint Laurent Boulevard. Street numbers rise eastward and westward from Saint Laurent Boulevard, and northward from the St. Lawrence River and the Lachine Canal. (Rue Charlevoix, in Le Sud-Ouest borough, is the only remaining named "north-south" street with large numbers of addresses on both sides of the Lachine Canal. In this case, the addresses south of the Lachine Canal have a "0" prefixed to their street numbers, e.g., 0919 rue Charlevoix.)

Climate 

Montreal lies at the confluence of several climatic regions. The island's climate is classified as humid continental or hemiboreal (Köppen climate classification Dfb) but is close to the transition to (Köppen climate classification Dfa)

Regular rainfall throughout the year averages . Summer is the wettest season statistically, but it is also the sunniest.

Due to wind chill, the perceived temperature can be much lower than the actual temperature, and wind chill factor is often included in Montreal weather forecasts. High humidity is common in the summer, which makes the perceived temperature higher than the actual temperature. In spring and autumn, rainfall averages between  a month. Some snow in spring and autumn is normal. Similarly, early and late heat waves with "Indian summers" are a regular feature of the climate.

2006 was noted as the only year in the history of Montreal when there was more rain than there was snow. That year, Montreal received more rain than Vancouver, British Columbia.

Montreal is ranked 160 out of 190 world cities in the 2018 STC Climate index, a ranking of the best climates to live and work in.

Winter 
Winter in Montreal is usually cold and snowy, and can be windy at times. Most days stay near or below freezing, and temperatures remain well below freezing at night. Sometimes with windchill, temperatures may feel colder than the actual temperature. Temperatures in the downtown core can be warmer than those in the northwestern suburbs by up to  due to the urban heat island effect. Some days are milder with temperatures staying well above freezing; conversely, night temperatures occasionally plunge below , especially with windchill.

Montreal receives plenty of snow throughout the winter season. Snow mainly falls between early December and early March, although it mostly snows in January and February. Although it is rare, light snow could fall in late October and April.

Despite plenty of snow during winter, Montreal is seeing an increasing amount of rain rather than snow during the winter. But Montreal still sees plenty of days with sunshine compared to other places at similar latitudes, or even farther south, and more winter sunshine than anywhere in northern and northwestern Europe.

Precipitation occurs between 13 and 17 days per month, including an average of 59 days of snowfall.

Spring 
Spring in Montreal ranges from chilly to warm to very occasionally, hot weather. Spring-like weather, by Montreal standards, usually arrives in mid-March, sometimes earlier or later, with temperatures around  triggering snowmelt but the weather is very unpredictable. Trees usually start leafing out during the last week of the month. May is significantly warmer than earlier spring.

Spring is also slightly sunnier than autumn, with longer available daylight hours. An exceptionally hot spring day occurred on May 27, 2020. 
with the temperature reaching , this was over  higher than previously recorded during May.

Precipitation occurs on average between 12 and 14 days per month.

Summer 
The summer months of June to mid-September in general bring warm to hot humid weather. Some nights, temperatures remain at or above . Temperatures reach and exceed  on many days combined with high humidity, making it feel hotter. Although summer in Montreal can be deemed muggy much of the time, the air temperature has never exceeded , unlike in most other major North American cities.

While summer is the sunniest season, short-lived thunderstorms are also common.
Rain typically occurs on average between 12 and 13 days per month, although it is  only occasionally a long lasting event.

Autumn 
Temperatures start to cool off towards the end of September, allowing for brilliant fall foliage in October. Snowfall can strike in October but chances increase significantly in November. Late autumn receives slightly less sunshine than early spring. Autumn usually turns to winter by early December.
Precipitation occurs on average between 12 and 15 days per month.

Sunshine 
Montreal and the southern Quebec region receive slightly over 2,000 hours of sunshine annually, with summer being the sunniest season. The sunniest month is July with 272 hours, and the least sunny is December with 84 hours.

Montreal receives more sunshine than northern and northwestern Europe, even in locations at similar or even somewhat farther south latitudes, especially during winter.

Precipitation 

As in the Northeastern U.S. and most of Southeastern Canada, precipitation is spread evenly throughout the year, with no wet or dry seasons. Montreal has 163 days annually with some rain or snow.
Thunderstorms can occur any time between late spring and early autumn.

Statistics

Notes

References

External links
3920 aerial photographs of the Island of Montreal, 1947-1949 from the Archives de la Ville de Montréal